The 2011 German GP2 round was a GP2 Series motor race held on July 23 and 24, 2011 at Nürburgring, Germany. It is the sixth round of the 2011 GP2 season. The race supported the 2011 German Grand Prix.

Classification

Qualifying

Notes
 – Herck was given a three place grid penalty for Feature Race after impeding Bird in the qualifying session.

Feature Race

Notes
 – Leimer was excluded from Feature Race classification for causing collisions.

Sprint Race

Notes
 – Leimer, excluded from Race 1, started Sprint Race last on the grid.
 – Varhaug was given a ten grid place penalty for causing a collision during Feature Race.

Standings after the round

Drivers' Championship standings

Teams' Championship standings

 Note: Only the top five positions are included for both sets of standings.

See also 
 2011 German Grand Prix
 2011 Nürburgring GP3 Series round

References

External links
GP2 Series official website: Results

2011 GP2 Series rounds
2011 in German motorsport
Sport in Rhineland-Palatinate